Gorno-Altaysk Airport  is an airport in Russia located 9 km west of Gorno-Altaysk.  It services small airliners. In 2019, 102,338 passengers passed through this airport.

New terminal and new runway
In 2011, the construction of a new terminal and a new and modern runway, for accepting larger aircraft, was finished. The new terminal and runway were first tested by an Airbus A319 completing a S7 Airlines flight to Novosibirsk.

Airlines and destinations

References

External links

Official website  
http://www.air-altai.ru/ 

Airports built in the Soviet Union
Airports in the Altai Republic
Gorno-Altaysk